XEAV-AM is a radio station serving the Guadalajara, Jalisco, Mexico area. Branded as Canal 58, the station broadcasts on 580 AM.

History
XEAV received its first concession in 1942. It was owned by Alfredo Vázquez Tello.

References

External links

Radio stations in Guadalajara